Henry Beston (June 1, 1888 – April 15, 1968) was an American writer and naturalist, best known as the author of The Outermost House, written in 1928.

Early life and work
Born Henry Beston Sheahan, he was born and grew up in Quincy, Massachusetts with his parents, Dr. Joseph Sheahan and Marie Louise (Maurice) Beston Sheahan, and brother George, a doctor. Beston attended Adams Academy in Quincy before earning his B.A. (1909) and M.A. (1911) from Harvard College. While at Harvard, he lived at the historic Parson Capen House in Topsfield, Massachusetts.

In 1912, Beston took up teaching at the University of Lyon. In 1914 he returned to Harvard as an English department assistant. Beston joined the French army in 1915 and served as an ambulance driver. His service in le Bois le Pretre and at the Battle of Verdun was described in his first book, A Volunteer Poilu. In 1918, Beston became a press representative for the U.S. Navy. Highlights from this period include being the only American correspondent to travel with the British Grand Fleet and to be aboard an American destroyer during combat engagement and sinking. His second book of journalistic work, Full Speed Ahead, described these experiences.

Following the end of World War I, Beston began writing fairy tales under the name "Henry Beston". In 1919, The Firelight Fairy Book was published, followed by The Starlight Wonder Book in 1923. During this time, he worked as an editor of The Living Age, an offshoot of The Atlantic Monthly. He also met his future wife Elizabeth Coatsworth, a fellow author of children's literature with whom he had two daughters, Margaret and Catherine.[3]:97 They lived at Hingham, Massachusetts, and Chimney Farm in Nobleboro, Maine.[6], during this time.

The Outermost House
The Outermost House, now considered a Cape Cod nature literary classic, was written after Beston spent what he called "a year of life on the Great Beach of Cape Cod". Spiritually shaken by his experiences in World War I, Beston retreated to the outer beach at Eastham in search of peace and solitude.

"Nature is part of our humanity, and without some awareness of that divine mystery, man ceases to be man," Beston wrote.

Beston, who dedicated himself as a "writer/naturalist", is considered one of the fathers of the modern environmental movement, and The Outermost House has been called one of the motivating factors behind the establishment of the Cape Cod National Seashore. Author Rachel Carson said that Beston was the only author who ever influenced her writing.

The 20x16 house, dubbed "the Fo'castle" by Beston, was built by Eastham carpenter Harvey Moore in the late spring of 1925. Beston stayed there, on and off, for about two years, leaving the beach occasionally, but was usually on the beach for the many severe storms that struck the Cape in the winter. His house was located two miles south of the Nauset Coast Guard Station, with the Atlantic Ocean near his front door and Nauset Marsh behind him. His only neighbors were the Coast Guardsmen, who patrolled the beach.

The Outermost House was published in 1928, and has gone through dozens of printings since then. An audiobook version was released in 2007.

Leaving the Outermost House
Beston married writer Elizabeth Coatsworth in 1929, and the couple eventually bought a farmhouse called "Chimney Farm" in Nobleboro, Maine. Beston wrote several more books while living in Maine (Northern Farm and Herbs and the Earth among them), but never again approached the overall acclaim that he achieved in The Outermost House.

In the 1940s, Beston received honorary doctorates from Bowdoin College, Dartmouth College, and University of Maine and was made honorary member of Phi Beta Kappa at Harvard. He was also made honorary editor of National Audubon Magazine. In 1949, a twentieth-anniversary edition of The Outermost House was released. Beston also edited an anthology of writings about Maine, White Pine and Blue Water (1950).

Beston lectured regularly at Dartmouth College and wrote for publications like The Atlantic and Christian Science Monitor throughout the 1950s. He also revised his earlier work in children's literature and published Henry Beston's Fairy Tales in 1952. He was elected a Fellow of the American Academy of Arts and Sciences (AAAS) in 1954. In 1959, he was the third recipient of the AAAS' Emerson-Thoreau Medal, previously awarded to only Robert Frost and T. S. Eliot.

Beston donated the "Fo'castle" to the Massachusetts Audubon Society in 1959. One of its tenants was a woman from Sharon, Massachusetts named Nan Turner Waldron, who would spend several weeks each year there from 1961 to 1977. Her experiences are chronicled in the book Journey to Outermost House.

With his health deteriorating, Beston returned to the beach in Eastham one last time on October 11, 1964, when his famous house was dedicated as a National Literary Landmark. Beston died on April 15, 1968, in Nobleboro, Maine, and is buried in a small cemetery at Chimney Farm.  Chimney Farm was listed on the National Register of Historic Places in 2007.

The house was carried away by extreme high tides during a winter hurricane in February 1978. Waldron wrote that thousands still come to the beach each year, wanting to learn more about this man who retreated to the outer beach "in a search for the great truth, and found it in the spirit of man," as his National Literary Landmark dedication plaque read. "Many know the book, some carry it with them," Waldron wrote. "Still they come, pilgrims of a sort- stirred by his sense of wonder but drawn by his vision of hope."

Bibliography
A Volunteer Poilu (1916)
Full Speed Ahead (1919)
The Firelight Fairy Book (1919)
The Starlight Wonder Book (1921)
Book of Gallant Vagabonds (1925)
The Sons of Kai (1926)
The Living Age (1921)
The Outermost House (1928)
Herbs and The Earth (1935)American Memory (1937)Five Bears and Miranda (1939)The Tree that Ran Away (1941)Chimney Farm Bedtime Stories (1941)The St. Lawrence (1942)Northern Farm: A Chronicle of Maine (1948)White Pine and Blue Water: A State of Maine Reader (1950) (editor)Henry Beston's Fairy Tales (1952)Especially Maine: The Natural World of Henry Beston'' (1972)

References

External links

The Friends of Henry Beston
 
 
 
The Henry Beston Society
 Audiobook: "The Outermost House"
 Audiobook: "The Firelight Fairy Book"
Various stories by Henry Beston (full text)

 
 The Papers of Henry Beston at Dartmouth College Library

1888 births
1968 deaths
Harvard College alumni
Academic staff of the University of Lyon
American children's writers
20th-century American memoirists
American non-fiction environmental writers
American naturalists
People from Nobleboro, Maine
Writers from Quincy, Massachusetts
Fellows of the American Academy of Arts and Sciences
People from Hingham, Massachusetts
American nature writers
American male non-fiction writers
20th-century naturalists